The Greenwood Commonwealth is a newspaper serving in and operating out of Greenwood, Mississippi. It began publication in 1896. Governor and senator James Vardaman was its editor in the early 20th century.

References

External links
 The Greenwood Commonwealth

Newspapers published in Mississippi
Leflore County, Mississippi
1896 establishments in Mississippi
Publications established in 1896